In enzymology, a L-pipecolate dehydrogenase is an enzyme that catalyzes the chemical reaction

L-pipecolate + acceptor  2,3,4,5-tetrahydropyridine-2-carboxylate + reduced acceptor

Thus, the two substrates of this enzyme are L-pipecolate and acceptor, whereas its two products are 2,3,4,5-tetrahydropyridine-2-carboxylate and reduced acceptor.

This enzyme belongs to the family of oxidoreductases, specifically those acting on the CH-NH group of donors with other acceptors.  The systematic name of this enzyme class is L-pipecolate:acceptor 1,6-oxidoreductase. This enzyme is also called L-pipecolate:(acceptor) 1,6-oxidoreductase.  This enzyme participates in lysine degradation.

References

 

EC 1.5.99
Enzymes of unknown structure